Creedy is a surname. Notable people with the surname include:

Adam Creedy (fl. 1388), English politician
Pat Creedy (1927–2011), Kiwi rugby player
Rebecca Creedy (born 1983), Australian swimmer
Simon Creedy (born 1962) Graphic Designer - Logo Design expert

See also
 Creedy, Sandford, historic estate in Devon, England
 River Creedy